Krista Lynn Howell is a Canadian politician, who was elected to the Newfoundland and Labrador House of Assembly in the 2021 provincial election. She represents the electoral district of St. Barbe-L'Anse aux Meadows as a member of the Liberal Party of Newfoundland and Labrador. She became the first female mayor of St. Anthony in 2019.

On April 8, 2021, Howell was appointed Minister of Municipal and Provincial Affairs.

Election results

References 

Living people
Liberal Party of Newfoundland and Labrador MHAs
21st-century Canadian politicians
21st-century Canadian women politicians
Women MHAs in Newfoundland and Labrador
Mayors of places in Newfoundland and Labrador
Women mayors of places in Newfoundland and Labrador
Year of birth missing (living people)
Members of the Executive Council of Newfoundland and Labrador
Women government ministers of Canada